Freudenstein is a surname. Notable people with the surname include:

 Astrid Freudenstein (born 1973), German politician
 Ferdinand Freudenstein (1926–2006), physicist
 George Freudenstein (1921–2007), politician

See also
 Freudenstein Castle
 Stahlbahnwerke Freudenstein

German-language surnames
Jewish surnames
Yiddish-language surnames